Ochsenheimeria capella is a moth of the  family Ypsolophidae. It is found in Hungary and from Russia to northern Kazakhstan.

The wingspan is about 10 mm.

The larvae feed on Secale cereale, Setaria italica and Stipa species. They probably mine the leaves of their host plant for about a week. The larva then continues feeding as a stem borer.

References

Moths described in 1860
Ypsolophidae
Moths of Europe
Moths of Asia